Kahramankazan (previously named Kazan) is a town and district of the Ankara Province in the Central Anatolia region of Turkey, standing on the plain of Akıncı to the north west of the city of Ankara. According to 2010 census, population of the district is 39,537 of which 37,718 live in the town of Kahramankazan.

History
Archaeological research reveals the plain has a long past, going back to prehistoric times, and findings during the excavation of the Bitik Höyük mound date back to the copper age.

Kahramankazan today
Today the area is a popular weekend retreat for the people of Ankara. Kahramankazan is a busy small town. Industry in the city includes a brewery and a cement factory.

Opened in November 2011, the Turkish Satellite Assembly, Integration and Test Center (UMET), is situated in the Fethiye neighborhood of the city.

A large trona ore deposit, which lays  underground, is mined and processed by Kazan Soda Elektrik of Ciner Holding in the city.

Administrative divisions

Neighborhoods

Villages

Notes

References

External links
 Kahramankazan Governorship's website  (in Turkish)
 District municipality's official website (in Turkish)
 A scientific paper on the etymology of the name Kazan

 
Populated places in Ankara Province
Districts of Ankara Province